The British Museum Act 1902 (2 Edw 7 c. 12) was an Act of Parliament of the Parliament of the United Kingdom, given the royal assent on 22 July 1902 and repealed in 1963.

In order to alleviate the storage problems at the British Museum in London, England, it empowered the trustees to remove "newspapers and other printed matter which are rarely required for public use" to a new storage building at Hendon, on the condition that suitable arrangements were put in place for these materials to be consulted at the main buildings on request. These are to be found in the British Library Newspapers section located in Colindale.

The Act was repealed by the British Museum Act 1963.

See also
British Museum Act

References
The Public General Acts Passed in the Second Year of the Reign of His Majesty King Edward the Seventh. London: printed for His Majesty's Stationery Office. 1902.
Chronological table of the statutes; HMSO, London. 1993.

United Kingdom Acts of Parliament 1902
Act 1902
1963 disestablishments in the United Kingdom
1902 in London
British Museum Acts